Ortona Lighthouse is an active lighthouse located in Ortona on the Adriatic Sea.

Description
The lighthouse is completely automated and is managed by the Marina Militare with the identification code number 3864 E.F.

See also
List of lighthouses in Italy

References

External links
 Servizio Fari Marina Militare

Lighthouses in Italy